Osek is a municipality and village in Jičín District in the Hradec Králové Region of the Czech Republic. It has about 200 inhabitants.

History
The first written mention of Osek is from 1360.

References

External links

Villages in Jičín District